Mats Erik Segerstedt (born 20 April 1983) is a Swedish singer.

Segerstedt was born in Uddevalla.  As a student he attended the Adolf Fredrik's Music School in Stockholm. He was the runner-up to Markus Fagervall on the third season of Swedish version of Idol 2006.

Erik was part of the Swedish band E.M.D., alongside two other Idol contestants, Danny Saucedo from  Idol 2006 and Mattias Andréasson from Idol 2007. The band took a break in late 2010.

Erik was a contestant in Let's Dance 2013. He also voiced Prince Hans in the Swedish dub of Disney's Frozen.

Idol
Erik Segerstedt took part in Idol 2006, singing the following:

After having reached the final, he finished as runner-up to winner Markus Fagervall after declaration of the results of the public vote.

Post-Idol
Segerstedt was signed at Sony BMG and on 21 February 2007 his debut album A Different Shade was released. The album debuted at #2 on the Swedish albums chart and stayed at this position for a second week. The first single "I Can't say I'm Sorry" written by Andreas Carlsson peaked at #1 on Sverigetopplistan, the Swedish Singles Chart.

E.M.D.

In 2007, Segerstedt formed the musical trio, a boyband called E.M.D., with Mattias Andréasson and Danny Saucedo. Like Segerstedt, both Andréasson and Saucedo had taken part in the Swedish version of Idol, with Danny Saucedo finishing 6th on Idol 2006 and Mattias Andréasson as the fourth runner-up on Idol 2007.

Their first single, a cover of Bryan Adams, Rod Stewart and Sting's hit "All For Love", was a chart success. They released their debut album, A State of Mind, in May 2008 with "Jennie Let Me Love You" and "Alone)" as singles and, after the release of the deluxe album edition, the single "Baby Goodbye" which was their song on Melodifestivalen 2009, finishing third in the final of the competition.

In November 2009, E.M.D. released their holiday album Välkommen hem. The Christmas single charted at number 3 on Sverigetopplistan. E.M.D.'s third album  Rewind was in 2010. The single "Save Tonight" a cover of an Eagle-Eye Cherry song charted at number 5.

In late 2010, E.M.D. announced an indefinite hiatus and broke up.

Melodifestivalen
In 2013, Segerstedt entered Melodifestivalen 2013 with the duet "Hello Goodbye" with Tone Damli in a bid to represent Sweden in the Eurovision Song Contest. The duo came fourth in the second heat and qualified to the Second Chance round held where they finished in fifth place. They were therefore unable to reach the final and were eliminated from the competition.

Discography

Solo work
Studio albums

Singles

E.M.D.

Studio albums
2008: A State of Mind
2009: A State of Mind (Deluxe Edition)
2009: Välkommen hem
2010: Rewind

Singles
2007: "All for Love"
2008: "Jennie Let Me Love You"
2008: "Alone"
2009: "Baby Goodbye"
2009: "Youngblood"
2009: "Välkommen hem
2010: "Save Tonight"
2010: "What Is Love"

References

External links
Official website

Swedish male voice actors
Idol (Swedish TV series) participants
1983 births
Living people
People from Uddevalla Municipality
E.M.D. members
21st-century Swedish singers
21st-century Swedish male singers
Melodifestivalen contestants of 2013
Melodifestivalen contestants of 2009